Volker Knappheide (born 28 March 1966) is a retired German football midfielder.

References

External links
 

1966 births
Living people
German footballers
Bundesliga players
VfL Bochum players
Association football midfielders
Footballers from Essen